Ola David Raa Hunderi (4 February 1939 – 13 June 2016) was a Norwegian physicist.

He took the dr.philos. degree in 1970, and was appointed as professor at the Norwegian Institute of Technology in 1981. From 1987 to 1993 he was the research director at SINTEF.

References

1939 births
2016 deaths
Norwegian physicists
Academic staff of the Norwegian Institute of Technology
Academic staff of the Norwegian University of Science and Technology